was a Japanese physicist. Arata was one of the pioneering researchers into nuclear fusion in Japan and a former professor at Osaka University. He was reported to be a strong nationalist, speaking only Japanese in public.  He received the Order of Culture in 2006.

Arata started researching and publishing in the field of cold fusion around 1998, together with his colleague Yue Chang Zhang.

Further reading
 Japan's "Cold fusion" Effort Produces Startling Claims of Bursts of Neutrons", Wall Street Journal, 4 December 1989
 "New life for cold fusion?" New Scientist, 9 December 1989, p. 19
 N. Wada and K. Nishizawa, "Nuclear fusion in solid", Japanese Journal of Applied Physics, 1989, 28:L2017

Publications
 Y. Arata and Y. C. Zhang. "Achievement of intense 'cold' fusion reaction," Proceedings of the Japanese Academy, series B, 1990. 66:l.
 Y.Arata. Patent Application US 2006/0153752 A

References

1924 births
2018 deaths
Japanese nuclear physicists
Japanese metallurgists
Recipients of the Order of Culture
Academic staff of Osaka University
Osaka University alumni
Cold fusion
People from Kyoto Prefecture